In the mathematical fields of differential geometry and algebraic geometry, the Frankel conjecture was a problem posed by Theodore Frankel in 1961. It was resolved in 1979 by Shigefumi Mori, and by Yum-Tong Siu and Shing-Tung Yau.

In its differential-geometric formulation, as proved by both Mori and by Siu and Yau, the result states that if a closed Kähler manifold has positive bisectional curvature, then it must be biholomorphic to complex projective space. In this way, it can be viewed as an analogue of the sphere theorem in Riemannian geometry, which (in a weak form) states that if a closed and simply-connected Riemannian manifold has positive curvature operator, then it must be diffeomorphic to a sphere. This formulation was extended by Ngaiming Mok to the following statement:

This version is known as the Hartshorne conjecture, after Robin Hartshorne.

References 

 Theodore Frankel. Manifolds with positive curvature. Pacific J. Math. 11 (1961), 165–174.  
 Robin Hartshorne. Ample subvarieties of algebraic varieties.  Notes written in collaboration with C. Musili. Lecture Notes in Mathematics, Vol. 156 (1970). Springer-Verlag, Berlin-New York. xiv+256 pp.  
 Shoshichi Kobayashi and Takushiro Ochiai. Characterizations of complex projective spaces and hyperquadrics. J. Math. Kyoto Univ. 13 (1973), 31–47.  
 Ngaiming Mok. The uniformization theorem for compact Kähler manifolds of nonnegative holomorphic bisectional curvature. J. Differential Geom. 27 (1988), no. 2, 179–214.  
 Shigefumi Mori. Projective manifolds with ample tangent bundles. Ann. of Math. (2) 110 (1979), no. 3, 593–606.  
 Yum Tong Siu and Shing Tung Yau. Compact Kähler manifolds of positive bisectional curvature.  Invent. Math. 59 (1980), no. 2, 189–204.  

Differential geometry
Algebraic geometry
Conjectures